For Darkest Eyes is the first video release by death/doom metal band My Dying Bride. Created first as a VHS in 1997, then later being reproduced as a DVD in 2002. Live footage from Willem II, The Netherlands on 3 November 1993, the picture gallery and the live song Sear Me done in Simplon 1992 do not appear on the video version due to time constraints of the old VHS format.

Original VHS footage 
Video Clips
 "Symphonaire Infernus Et Spera Empyrium" – 5:31
 "The Thrash of Naked Limbs – 4:41
 "The Songless Bird – 4:49
 "I Am the Bloody Earth"
 "The Cry of Mankind" – 4:45
 "For You" – 4:16

Live - Kraków, Poland 01/03/1996
 "A Sea to Suffer In" – 6:11
 "The Songless Bird" – 6:07
 "The Crown of Sympathy" – 9:47
 "The Thrash of Naked Limbs – 6:33
 "The Cry of Mankind" – 6:53
 "Your River" – 7:47
 "Black Voyage" – 9:27
 "Your Shameful Heaven" – 6:03
 "From Darkest Skies" – 7:54
 "The Forever People" – 5:00

DVD release footage 
Video Clips
 "Symphonaire Infernus Et Spera Empyrium" – 5:31
 "The Thrash of Naked Limbs" – 4:41
 "The Songless Bird" – 4:49
 "I Am the Bloody Earth"
 "The Cry of Mankind" – 4:45
 "For You" – 4:16

Live - Kraków, Poland 01/03/1996
 "A Sea to Suffer In" – 6:11
 "The Songless Bird" – 6:07
 "The Crown of Sympathy" – 9:47
 "The Thrash of Naked Limbs" – 6:33
 "The Cry of Mankind – 6:53
 "Your River" – 7:47
 "Black Voyage – 9:27
 "Your Shameful Heaven" – 6:03
 "From Darkest Skies" – 7:54
 "The Forever People" – 5:00

Live - Willem II, The Netherlands 07/11/1993
 "The Songless Bird" – 7:20
 "The Snow in My Hand" – 7:10
 "The Crown of Sympathy" – 10:29
 "The Thrash of Naked Limbs" – 6:56
 "I Am the Bloody Earth" – 6:59
 "Symphonaire Infernus Et Spera Empyrium" – 5:52
 "Turn Loose the Swans" – 10:37
 "Sear Me MCMXCIII" – 7:10
 "Sear Me" [Live in Simplon 1992]

Live - Dynamo Festival 1995
 "Your River" – 8:37
 "A Sea to Suffer In" – 6:44
 "The Songless Bird" – 7:04
 "The Cry of Mankind" – 6:46

Gallery
 The Band – 7:18
 Artwork – 3:37

References

1997 video albums
My Dying Bride live albums
Live video albums
Music video compilation albums
My Dying Bride video albums
1997 live albums
1997 compilation albums